Phoenicolacerta kulzeri is a species of lizard in the family Lacertidae. The species is endemic to Western Asia.

Etymology
The specific name, kulzeri, is in honor of German coleopterist Hans Kulzer (1889-1974), collector of the holotype.

Geographic range
P. kulzeri is found in Jordan, Lebanon, and Syria.

Habitat
The natural habitat of P. kulzeri is rocky areas.

Reproduction
P. kulzeri is oviparous.

Conservation status
P. kulzeri is threatened by habitat loss.

Subspecies
Three subspecies are recognized as being valid, including the nominotypical subspecies.
Phoenicolacerta kulzeri petraea 
Phoenicolacerta kulzeri khasaliensis 
Phoenicolacerta kulzeri kulzeri 

Nota bene: A trinomial authority in parentheses indicates that the subspecies was originally described in a genus other than Phoenicolacerta.

References

Further reading
Arnold EN, Arribas O, Carranza S (2007). "Systematics of the Palaearctic and Oriental lizard tribe Lacertini (Squamata: Lacertidae: Lacertinae), with descriptions of eight new genera". Zootaxa 1430: 1-86. (Phoenicolacerta kulzeri, new combination, p. 51).
Bischoff W, Müller J (1999). "Revision des levantinischen Lacerta laevis/kulzeri-Komplexes: 2. Die Petra-Eidechse Lacerta kulzeri petraea ssp.n. ". Salamandra 35 (4): 243–254. (Lacerta kulzeri petraea, new subspecies). (in German, with an abstract in English).
Modrý D, Nečas P, Rifai L, Bischoff W, Hamidan N, Amr Z (2013). "Revision of the “Lacerta” laevis/kulzeri-Complex: 3. The Rock Lizard of Wadi Ramm, Phoenicolacerta kulzeri khazalinsis ssp. n." Vertebrate Zoology 63 (3): 307-312. (Phoenicolacerta kulzeri khazaliensis, new subspecies). (in English, with an abstract in German).
Müller L, Wettstein O (1932). "Über eine neue Lacerta-Form aus dem Libanon ". Zoologischer Anzeiger 98: 218–223. (Lacerta kulzeri, new species). (in German).

Phoenicolacerta
Reptiles described in 1933
Taxa named by Lorenz Müller
Taxa named by Otto von Wettstein
Taxonomy articles created by Polbot